The Chartered Institute of Marketing Ghana an umbrella body of marketers in Ghana. It was established in July 1981 and was officially known as the  Institute of Marketing, Ghana until 1992 when it was changed to the Chartered Institute of Marketing, Ghana.

Mission
The institute seeks to improve the marketing profession in Ghana.

References

Business organisations based in Ghana
Marketing organizations